Gargol is a small unincorporated community in Huntington Township,  Adams County, Pennsylvania, United States. Gargol is located approximately halfway between Idaville and York Springs.
The current Sheriff of Gargol is Andy Feeser (honorary)

Former residence of Gertie Guise, a respected alternative healing practicer in the Pennsylvania Dutch tradition referred as  Powwower or Granny Lady. The name Gargol is in local tradition because the area had a herb of that name that was used as a swine medicine.  Gargol however is a surname in Europe and subsequently North America. Among the local geographic formations are igneous diabase sills and dikes that are associated with iron ore deposits. The Chestnut Grove iron furnace was  nearby on Bermudian Creek.

Gone is a small store and post office with only a couple of homes remaining along an unnamed tributary of Bermudian Creek. Gargol is surrounded with orchard and farms.

References

Unincorporated communities in Adams County, Pennsylvania
Unincorporated communities in Pennsylvania